Tawngpeng (Loi Lung in Shan) was a Shan state in what is today Myanmar. It belonged to the Northern Shan States.
The capital was Namhsan (Om-yar).

History
The predecessor state was named Pappatasara. Not much is known about the history of the state before the 19th century, all that is available are legends. 

Tawngpeng state was founded in 1753; it was the only Palaung kingdom in the former Shan States, the ruling family belonging to this ethnic group as well, although adopting the paraphernalia and the style of ethnic Shan rulers. The people of the area are predominantly of the Ka-tur (Samlong) tribe. The main industry of this mostly hilly state was tea production. Before British rule in Burma two successive saophas were executed and a further one was murdered.

Rulers
The rulers of Tawngpeng State bore the title Saopha.

Saophas
1753 - 1760                Ta Dwe Ba                           (b. 1681 - d. 1760)
1760 - 1764                Ba Hkun Mya                         (b. 1690 - d. 1764)
1764 - 1775                Ba Hkun Saing                       (b. 1700 - d. 1775)
1775 - 1781                Ba Dwe Taw                          (b. 1701 - d. 1781)
1781                       Ba Loi Lio                          (b. 1745 - d. 1810)
1781 - 1819                Ba Hkun Kein Möng                   (d. 1819)
1819 - 1837                Ba Hkun Hso                         (b. 1748 - d. 1837)
1837 - 1846                Ba Hkun Tan Möng                    (b. 1770 - d. 1846)
1847 -  4 Sep 1858         Shwe Ok Hka (Shwe Taung Kyaw)
1858 - 1861                Hkun Hsa (Ba Hkam Hkun Shinye)      (b. 1774 - d. 1865)
1861                       Hkun Gya                            (d. 1861)
1861 - 1865                Hkun Aung Hla                       (d. 1865)
1865 - 1880                Hkam Kwan
1880 - 1887                Hkun Hkam Möng (Hkam Mon)           (b. 1821 - d. 1887)
1888 - 1895                Hkam Tan Möng (Hkun Kyan)           (d. 1895)
1895 - 1926                Hkun Hsan Gawn                      (b. 1871 - d. 1926)
Aug 1926 - 1952            Hkun Pan Sing                       (b. 1894 - d. 1975)

References

External links
"Gazetteer of Upper Burma and the Shan states"
Ta'Ang Land

Shan States
Palaung people